Iron(II) hydroxide or ferrous hydroxide is an inorganic compound with the formula Fe(OH)2. It is produced when iron(II) salts, from a compound such as iron(II) sulfate, are treated with hydroxide ions. Iron(II) hydroxide is a white solid, but even traces of oxygen impart a greenish tinge.  The air-oxidised solid is sometimes known as "green rust".

Preparation and reactions
Iron(II) hydroxide is poorly soluble in water (1.43 × 10−3 g/L), or 1.59 × 10−5 mol/L.  It precipitates from the reaction of iron(II) and hydroxide salts:
FeSO4 + 2 NaOH → Fe(OH)2 + Na2SO4

If the solution is not deoxygenated and iron not totally reduced in Fe(II), the precipitate can vary in colour starting from green to reddish brown depending on the iron(III) content.  Iron(II) ions are easily substituted by iron(III) ions produced by its progressive oxidation.

It is also easily formed as a by-product of other reactions, a.o., in the synthesis of siderite, an iron carbonate (FeCO3), if the crystal growth conditions are imperfectly controlled.

Structure
Fe(OH)2 is a layer double hydroxide (LDH) easily accommodating  in its crystal lattice ferric ions produced by oxidation of ferrous ions by the atmospheric oxygen.

Related materials
Green rust is a recently discovered mineralogical form. All forms of green rust (including fougerite) are more complex and variable than the ideal iron(II) hydroxide compound.

Reactions
Under anaerobic conditions, the iron(II) hydroxide can be oxidised by the protons of water to form magnetite (iron(II,III) oxide) and molecular hydrogen.
This process is described by the Schikorr reaction:
3 Fe(OH)2 → Fe3O4 + H2 + 2 H2O

Anions such as selenite and selenate can be easily adsorbed on the positively charged surface of iron(II) hydroxide, where they are subsequently reduced by Fe2+. The resulting products are poorly soluble (Se0, FeSe, or FeSe2).

Natural occurrence

Iron dissolved in groundwater is in the reduced iron II form. If this groundwater comes in contact with oxygen at the surface, e.g. in natural springs, iron II is oxidised to iron III and forms insoluble hydroxides in water.
The natural analogue of iron(II) hydroxide compound is the very rare mineral amakinite, .

Application 
Iron(II) hydroxide has also been investigated as an agent for the removal of toxic selenate and selenite ions from water systems such as wetlands. The iron(II) hydroxide reduces these ions to elemental selenium, which is insoluble in water and precipitates out.

In a basic solution iron(II) hydroxide is the electrochemically active material of the negative electrode of the nickel-iron battery.

See also
 Layered double hydroxides

References

Iron(II) compounds
Hydroxides
Materials

fr:Hydroxyde de fer